Vanja Babić (born 18 July 1981) is a Serbian taekwondo athlete.

He won bronze medals at the 2009 World Taekwondo Championships and at the 2012 European Taekwondo Championships.

References

world championship medal
european championship medal

1981 births
Living people
Serbian male taekwondo practitioners
Mediterranean Games bronze medalists for Serbia
Competitors at the 2013 Mediterranean Games
Mediterranean Games medalists in taekwondo
European Taekwondo Championships medalists
World Taekwondo Championships medalists
21st-century Serbian people